Daxter is a character from the Jak and Daxter video game series. First introduced in Jak and Daxter: The Precursor Legacy, Daxter is presented as Jak's cowardly, vulgar and womanizing best friend. Daxter's accidental transformation into an ottsel sets the plot of The Precursor Legacy into motion. In The Lost Frontier, Daxter is exposed to more Dark Eco and undergoes a further, but temporary, transformation into a form known as Dark Daxter.

Daxter's popularity led to the development of a eponymous spin-off game centered on the character. Critics were divided over their assessment of the character; some praised him and found to be funny, while others consider him to be annoying.

Development
In an interview, Naughty Dog's creative director Dan Arey said that "Jak is the hero you want to be, and Daxter is the hero you're afraid you are. Daxter is just a little bit concerned, a little bit afraid and he would rather take the easy way out." He also said they use Daxter as a "secret weapon" for when scenes start to get boring. In an interview, Didier Malenfant, president of Ready At Dawn, justified the development of a spin-off game centered on Daxter, as he considered him to be the best character in the series and that he is "Naughty Dog at its finest".

Daxter is Jak's sidekick and closest friend. Daxter is usually found perched on the shoulder of his close companion Jak, the player character of the Jak and Daxter series. Daxter also carries the majority of their conversations together, particularly in the first game where Jak is presented as a silent protagonist and Daxter does all the talking. This is implemented by the developers as a method to keep the player engaged in the exposition of the series' narrative. Daxter was voiced by Max Casella throughout the entirety of the series, with the exception of Richard McGonagle voicing the character in his incarnation as Dark Daxter in Jak and Daxter: The Lost Frontier.

Appearances
Daxter first appears in Jak and Daxter: The Precursor Legacy, where he and Jak take a boat to Misty Island, a place Samos the Sage warned them against visiting. Daxter accidentally falls into a vat of Dark Eco, and he is turned into an ottsel (half otter, half weasel). Daxter's accident leads the story's plot as he seeks help from Gol, to turn him back to normal. Before Daxter's accident, his original appearance is that of an orange-haired, buck-toothed cowardly boy.

In Jak II, a gate opens that sends Jak, Daxter, Keira, and Samos into Haven City, a future version of their world. As they appear, guards take Jak away to jail. Two years later, Daxter finds Jak and helps him break out of jail. They begin a quest to find out where they have been sent to, and meet back up with Keira and Samos. Along the way, they take jobs from a slum lord, Krew, and Daxter meets his love interest, Tess. After the events of the plot, Daxter takes over Krew's bar, and renames it the "Naughty Ottsel".

In Jak 3, Jak is thrown out of Haven City, into the wasteland, and Daxter follows him. Near the end of the plot, it is revealed that Daxter is same species as the Precursors, a group of ancient beings said to have created the world and the Eco in it. As they save the world, the precursors grant Daxter the thing he most wishes for; a pair of pants, and turn his girlfriend, Tess, into an Ottsel so they can be together.

Daxter takes place right after Jak and Daxter go through the warp gate, and are separated. An old man named Osmo offers Daxter a job exterminating Metal Bugs. Daxter accepts the job, and completes missions while also looking for Jak.

In The Lost Frontier, Daxter goes to The Brink with Jak to help escort Keira in her quest to become a sage. Daxter is exposed to more Dark Eco and undergoes a further, but temporary, transformation into a form known as Dark Daxter, similar to Dark Jak. While as Dark Daxter, Daxter grows to about eight feet tall, can shoot Dark Eco blasts, and can spin around like a tornado. His personality also changes while in this form, becoming more aggressive and reckless.

Both Jak and Daxter have appeared as playable characters in the crossover fighting game PlayStation All-Stars Battle Royale. Daxter also makes a cameo in Uncharted: Drake's Fortune, where Daxter is shown on the arm of a wetsuit which says "ottsel" on the front of it. Both Jak and Daxter also appears in Minecraft PlayStation 3 Edition and PlayStation 4 editions as skins via Skin Pack 3, their most recent appearance.

Reception
Daxter has received an overall mixed reception from critics. He was the subject of the "Original Game Character of the Year" award at the 2001 Game Developer's Conference. IGN described Daxter as "a comical, truly amazingly animated creature-character that brings a new sense of wonder and joy to videogames", calling him "eminently likeable." Daxter was listed as being the ninth-best video-game sidekick of all time by GameSpy, stating "We can't really talk about videogame sidekicks without a mention of the titular character in 2001's Jak and Daxter." Daxter was listed by IGN as being the sixth-best PS2 sidekick, being described as being "funny as hell." Game Informer called him the "life" of the Jak and Daxter series. MSN Entertainment named him as one of "Gaming's unsung heroes", saying he "was popular enough to get his own game." In Chapter 4 of the 2009 publication Writing for Video Game Genres: From FPS to RPG, John Feil described Daxter as one of the best examples of a non-player character being used as the primary vehicle for exposition in the video game industry, due to his portrayal as a "motor-mouth" with a tendency to comment on anything and everything the player sees. Feil observed that since he spends all of his time riding on Jak's shoulder and is functionally a "second head" for Jak, the developers avoided the need to program a complex companion artificial intelligence (AI) for Daxter while still keeping him involved with the game series' action and story.

Malenfant claimed that Daxter started off as a widely disliked character with players of the series, and that the divisive public opinion about the character appeared to have mellowed by the mid-2000s, which coincided with the anticipated release of the character's eponymous spin-off game. Daxter was named one of the worst video game sidekicks by 1UP.com staff and labelled a "terrible '80s stand-up comic" In GamesRadar's 2008 list of seven notable lazy character clichés found in fictional works, staff listed Daxter as an example of "The Animal With Attitude".

References

Animal characters in video games
Action-adventure game characters
Anthropomorphic mammals
Anthropomorphic video game characters
Extraterrestrial characters in video games
Fictional exiles
Fictional otters
Fictional weasels
Fighting game characters
Jak and Daxter characters
Male characters in video games
Science fiction video game characters
Shapeshifter characters in video games
Sony Interactive Entertainment protagonists
Video game characters introduced in 2001
Video game mascots
Video game sidekicks